Rafael Paasio's second cabinet was the 55th government of Finland. The administration ran from 23 February 1972 to 4 September 1972. It was a minority government formed by the Social Democratic Party.

Rafael Paasio resigned as Prime Minister on 4 September 1972 because the government was not able to start negotiations with the European Economic Community regarding a bilateral free trade area.

Ministers 

|}

References 

Paasio
1972 establishments in Finland
1972 disestablishments in Finland
Cabinets established in 1972
Cabinets disestablished in 1972